Sun and Shade is the sixth studio album by the American folk rock band Woods. It was released on June 14, 2011, by Woodsist.

Background
Sun and Shade was recorded at the Woodsist headquarters in Warwick, New York, with American musician Glenn Donaldson.

Release
On March 11, 2011, Woods announced the release of their album Sun and Shade.

Singles
Woods released the first single "Pushing Onlys" on April 1, 2011.

The second single "Out of the Eye" was released on May 16, 2011.

Tour
In support of the album, Woods went on tour, starting on May 28, 2011 at Xfinity Theatre (originally Concast Theatre) in Hartford, Connecticut, and finishing at the Scala nightclub in London, England on September 8, 2011. The band went on a tour of America later that year in December 2011.

Critical reception

Sun and Shade was met with "generally favorable" reviews from critics. At Metacritic, which assigns a weighted average rating out of 100 to reviews from mainstream publications, this release received an average score of 77 based on 17 reviews.

In a review for AllMusic, critic reviewer Tim Sendra wrote: "Woods have put it all together on Sun and Shade, matching inspiration with performance and crafting their best record yet, one that will stand with the great folk-psych albums of the past 40 years." At Consequence of Sound, Alex Young said: "On Sun and Shade, Woods’ fifth LP in as many years, the band performs their best balancing act yet by resting their wistful melodies on top of a flowing spirituality that pins the album low enough in the sky to provide just enough light to accompany the oncoming darkness." Ryan Reed of Paste gave a 6.8 out of 10 noting "every single second is bathed in charming nostalgia for a bygone era."

Accolades

Track listing

Charts

References

External links
 
 

2011 albums
Woods (band) albums
Woodsist albums